Gymnothorax sagmacephalus is a moray eel found in the northwest Pacific Ocean, around Japan. It was first named by Böhlke in 1997, and can reach a maximum length of about 53 cm.

References

sagmacephalus
Fish described in 1997